Dragoynovo is a village in central southern Bulgaria, in the Parvomay municipality of Plovdiv Province.

Geography 
The region of Dragoyna is located where the Maritsa valley merges with the high mountains of the Rhodopes. They are connected by a saddle.

As the highest point in the region, the peak has an extensive view.

Population 
According to the 2020 census, the village of Dragoyna has 243 inhabitants.

History 
The name of the village until 1906 was Kozluk.

In the 5th century BC, the powerful Odrysian kingdom was established in the Maritsa valley. The kingdom survived for centuries. The region of Dragoyna was probably a local centre of the Thracian aristocracy within the Odrysian kingdom. A high concentration of Thracian tumuli has been registered in the area. A golden ring has been found in Ezerovo near Dragoyna bearing an inscription that is thought to be in Thracian using the Greek alphabet. It indicates that the owners of the ring dedicated it to their deceased relatives. A settlement, most probably related to the sanctuary, was located close to the modern village of Dragoynovo.

In the 1st century AD this part of Thrace was added to the Roman Empire, and later it remained a part of its eastern half, the Byzantine Empire. It is known that a town center, fortifications and churches from the Late Antiquity and the Middle Ages existed in the region.

Culture and nature 
A Thracian sanctuary was discovered on Dragoyna Peak in 2004. The highest part of the peak of Golyama Dragoyna – an area of about 2 dka – is surrounded by a stone wall, which can be seen on the surface as stone ruins four to ten metres in width. The ruins consist largely of local stones with irregular shape, together with some large dressed stone blocks. A concentration of artifacts has been registered on the surface and in the treasure hunters' "trenches" within the area, surrounded by the stone wall as well as north of the stone wall. Pottery and treasure hunters' digs can be found also in an area of about 1 dka in the saddle between Golyama and Malka Dragoyna, where one of the ways to the peak is located. Traces of an ancient road are visible on the eastern slopes of the peak, which offers the shortest way to the site. Some artifacts have been registered on the southeast slopes. The artifact mapping suggests that they were part of the road.

There is an Orthodox Church in the village, bearing the name of "Sv. Georgi". It was built in 1853.

Famous locals 
 Angel Karaiotov, a 19th-century freedom fighter (hajduk)

References

External links 
 Thracian sanctuary in Dragoyna
 Tourism agencies in the region

  

Villages in Plovdiv Province